Colonel William Whitson Etches,  (15 May 1921 – 12 April 2015) was a senior British Army officer. He served with the commandos during the Second World War, taking part in the raid on St Nazaire for which he won the Military Cross and was taken as a prisoner of war.

References

1921 births
2015 deaths
British Army Commandos officers
British Army personnel of World War II
British World War II prisoners of war
Officers of the Order of the British Empire
People from Surrey
Recipients of the Military Cross
Royal Warwickshire Fusiliers officers
World War II prisoners of war held by Germany
Military personnel from Surrey